Kirk Hatcher is an American politician from the state of Alabama. He currently represents Alabama's 26th District in the Alabama State Senate. He is a member of the Democratic Party.

Education 
Hatcher graduated from Morehouse College in 1988 with a Bachelor of Arts degree in English Language and Literature. He later enrolled in Emory University, where he earned a Masters of Divinity degree in Theology in 1997.

Career 
After graduating from Emory, Hatcher moved to Rye, New York, where he worked as an English teacher at Rye County Day School. After resigning his position in 2015, he moved back to his hometown, Montgomery, Alabama, where he worked in community organization. In 2018, he ran for a position in the Alabama House of Representatives in District 78, which covers downtown Montgomery. He came in 2nd place in the initial Democratic primary election held on June 5, 2018, winning 37.6% of the vote and causing a runoff. In the runoff held 2 months later, Hatcher defeated incumbent Representative Alvin Holmes by 17.4%. Hatcher decisively defeated his independent opponent, Tijuanna Adetunji, in the November general election with 83.4% to her 16.3%. Hatcher's success was backed by several lobbying groups, including the Alabama Education Association, Medical Association of the State of Alabama, Alabama Bankers Association, Alabama Forestry Association, and Alabama Rural Electricity Association. After the resignation of Senator David Burkette, Hatcher ran for the empty seat in the Alabama Senate's District 26. He won the initial open primary with 47.9% of votes, nearly avoiding a runoff. In the runoff, Hatcher triumphed over his opponent, John Knight, winning with 74.2% of the vote. In the general election, Hatcher defeated Republican William Green with over 78% of votes cast.

Committee Positions 
Hatcher is a member of the Banking and Insurance, Education Policy, Tourism, and Transportation and Energy Committees.

Elections

Alabama House of Representatives District 78

2018 Democratic Primary

2018 Democratic Runoff

2018 General Election

Alabama State Senate District 26

2020 Democratic Primary

2020 Democratic Runoff

2020 General Election

References 

Democratic Party Alabama state senators
Emory University alumni
Morehouse College alumni
Year of birth missing (living people)
Living people